Shine is a re-issue of the 2002 album Bad Bad One by the singer-songwriter Meredith Brooks, released in 2004.  An instrumental version of the title track was the theme song for Dr. Phil from 2004 to 2008. (see 2004 in music).

Track listing

Personnel
Meredith Brooks – acoustic guitar, electric guitar, vocals, background vocals, slide guitar
Livingstone Brown – French horn, keyboards, background vocals, Moog synthesizer
David Darling – bass guitar, guitar, keyboards, background vocals
DJ Ginzu – turntables
Jennifer Love Hewitt – background vocals
Abe Laboriel Jr. – drums
Randy Landas – bass guitar
Daniel Shulman – bass guitar
Paul Trudeau – synthesizer, piano, background vocals
Windy Wagner – background vocals

Production
Producers: Meredith Brooks, David Darling
Engineers: Meredith Brooks, David Darling, Goldo Programming, Seth McLain, Michael Parnell, Jeff Peters
Mixing: Phil Kaffel
Mastering: Tom Baker
Programming: Meredith Brooks, David Darling, Goldo
Pro-tools: Meredith Brooks, Goldo, Seth McLain, Michael Parnell
Cover design: Marty Rosamond
Photography: Dana Tynan

References

Meredith Brooks albums
2004 albums
Reissue albums
Albums produced by Dave Darling